The 1988 NAIA Division II football season, as part of the 1988 college football season in the United States and the 33rd season of college football sponsored by the NAIA, was the 19th season of play of the NAIA's lower division for football.

The season was played from August to November 1988 and culminated in the 1988 NAIA Division II Football National Championship, played at the Memorial Stadium on the campus of Westminster College in New Wilmington, Pennsylvania.

Westminster (PA) defeated Wisconsin–La Crosse in the championship game, 21–14, to win their fourth NAIA national title.

Conference standings

Conference champions

Postseason

See also
 1988 NAIA Division I football season
 1988 NCAA Division I-A football season
 1988 NCAA Division I-AA football season
 1988 NCAA Division II football season
 1988 NCAA Division III football season

References

 
NAIA Football National Championship